The office of Mayor of Hereford, a city in the west midlands of England, is now a primarily ceremonial, non-political post. As the city's First Citizen, the mayor serves as the civic representative at a wide range of functions and events throughout the local authority area.

The office of Mayor of Hereford was created by Letters Patent on 15 November 1383 by King Richard II to replace the previous office of Chief Bailiff. The Mayor's full title is "The Right Worshipful the Mayor of Hereford". The mayor is traditionally addressed as "Your worship", as a court formality.

The following have been notable mayors of Hereford:
 1383–84 and 1393–95: Thomas Whitefield, MP for Hereford, 1378 and 1401
 1391–92: Thomas Chippenham, MP for Hereford, 1388 and 1402 
 1396–98: John Troney
 1398–1401:Thomas Chippenham
 1400–04, 1412–13, 1421–23: John Falk, MP for Hereford, 1420 
 1430–34: George Breinton
 1436–37, 1443–44: Henry Chippenham, MP for Hereford six times between 1406 and 1422
 1543–44: William Berkeley, MP for Hereford, 1547
 1555–56: John Kerry
 1571–72: James Warnecombe
 1573–74, 1576–77: Gregory Price, MP for Herefordshire and Hereford (6 times)
1604-5: John Warden
 1616–17: James Rodd, MP for Hereford, 1621
 1627–28: Richard Weaver, MP for Hereford six times between 1621 and 1640
 1683–84: Herbert Westfaling, MP for Hereford, 1660, 1661
 1829: James Eyre

 1901–02: Colonel Scobie
 1902–03: J. R. Symonds (Conservative)

21st century

 2000–01: Richard Thomas
 2001–02:  Susan Andrews
 2002–03: Alan Williams
 2003–04:  Wynifred Ursula Attfield
 2004–05:  Polly Andrews
 2005–06:  Marcelle Lloyd-Hayes
 2006–07: Robert Preece
 2007–08: Arthur Christopher Richard Chappell
 2008–09: Kevin Wargen
 2009–10:  Sylvia P A Daniels
 2010–11:  Anna Toon
 2011–12:  Julie Woodward 
 2012–13: Brian Wilcox
 2013–14: Phil Edwards
 2014–15: Len Tawn
 2015–16: Charles Nicholls
 2016–17: Jim Kenyon
 2017–18: Sharon Michaels
 2018–19: Sue Boulter 
 2019–21: Katherine Dallimore-Hey
 2021-22: Paul Stevens

References

External links
 History of Herefordian Mayors
 History of Hereford

Hereford
Mayors of Hereford

1383 establishments in England